Jean-Léonard Lugardon (30 September 1801, in Geneva – 16 August 1884, in Geneva) was a Swiss painter of portraits, historical scenes and genre pieces.

Life and works 
His ancestors were Protestants who had fled France, following the Edict of Nantes. He was born to the watchmaker, Albert Lugardon, and his wife, Catherine, née Duboule. From 1820 to 1822, he studied with Antoine-Jean Gros in Paris, and Jean-Auguste-Dominique Ingres in Florence. He worked there again, from 1823, when he held his first exhibition, to 1825. In 1824, Ingres encouraged him to enter a history painting competition in Geneva, which he won. After a brief return to Switzerland, occasioned by the death of his father, he was back in Italy, in Rome, from 1826 to 1829.

In 1826, he married Suzanne Paschoud, daughter of the printer and bookseller, Jean-Jacques Paschoud (1768-1826). The following year, she gave birth to their son, Albert (1827-1909), who also became a painter. She died while giving birth to a second child in 1830. He then returned to Geneva and began taking students: notably, Barthélemy Menn. After a successful showing at the Salon in 1835, he briefly returned to Paris. 

From 1836 to 1843, he was the Director of the figure drawing school at the Société des Arts. He also served as a city Councilor, from 1837 to 1842.

In 1851, he went on an extended study trip to Algeria; making sketches. He presented his finished works at the Exposition Universelle (1855).

In the late 1850s, his health began to decline, affecting his mental abilities, as well as physical. After that, he focused on presenting his existing works through the media of lithography and photography. From the late 1860s, he was essentially in retirement.

References

Further reading 
 Danielle Buyssens; "Les Nus de l’Helvétie héroïque. L’Atelier de Jean-Léonard Lugardon (1801–1884)", In: Peintre genevois de l’histoire suisse, Editions Passé-Présent and the Musée d'Art et d'Histoire (Geneva), 1991

External links

More works by Lugardon @ ArtNet
 

1801 births
1884 deaths
Artists from Geneva
Swiss portrait painters
History painters
Genre painters